Roger Campbell Corbett  (born 6 September 1942) is an Australian businessman. From January 1999 to September 2006, Corbett served as CEO of Woolworths Limited, a large retailing conglomerate.

Career
Educated at Shore School, Corbett graduated from UNSW Sydney with a Bachelor of Commerce.

In 2003, Corbett was appointed a Member of the Order of Australia (AM) for service to the retail industry, particularly as a contributor to the development of industry policy and standards, and to the community. In 2008, he was promoted to an officer of the Order of Australia (AO) for service to business, particularly through leadership and executive roles in the retail sector and a range of allied organisations, and to the community. He is also a member of the Liberal Party of Australia and serves as president of its Warringah branch.

There is a bitter relationship between the former Fairfax Media chairman and its largest shareholder Gina Rinehart. The relationship developed to the personal level once Fairfax Media's incumbent board of directors declined Gina Rinehart's request to offer her three seats on the board of directors.

Personal life
Corbett is married and has three children. He is a committed Christian.

References

1942 births
Living people
Australian businesspeople in retailing
Officers of the Order of Australia
University of New South Wales alumni
Directors of Walmart
People educated at Sydney Church of England Grammar School